Lieutenant General Thet Naing Win is a Lieutenant General in the Myanmar Army. He was the Minister of Border Affairs, having been appointed by Thein Sein in February 2013, to replace Thein Htay, who returned to the Ministry of Defence.

Early life 
Thet Naing Win was born on 22 July 1955 in Maubin, Irrawaddy Division, Burma. After obtaining a Bachelor of Science degree in Chemistry from the University of Mawlamyine, he joined and attended OTS intake 56. He later earned a Master of Arts degree in defence too.

Career 
Thet Naing Win served as the chief of the Defense Ministry's Bureau of Special Operations from 2010 to 2013. Before that, he was commander of the Southeastern Regional Command (Mon State) in the 2000s. Thet Naing Win on August 23 was elected General Secretary of the Union Solidarity and Development Party, preceded by Tin Naing Thein, former Minister of the President's Office of Myanmar and retired brigadier general. replacing former president Thein Sein.

References

Living people
Government ministers of Myanmar
1955 births
People from Ayeyarwady Region
Burmese military personnel
Union Solidarity and Development Party politicians